Peltodoris is a genus of sea slugs, dorid nudibranchs, shell-less marine gastropod molluscs in the family Discodorididae.

This genus differs from Discodoris by its lack of labial armature.
It feeds on sponges, favouring two genera.

And some of these species, such as Peltodoris nobilis, give off a strong lemony scent when rubbed vigorously.

Species 
Species in the genus Peltodoris include:
 Peltodoris atromaculata Bergh, 1880
 Peltodoris aurea Eliot, 1903
 Peltodoris carolynae Mulliner & Sphon, 1974 
 Peltodoris lancei Millen & Bertsch, 2000
 Peltodoris lentiginosa (Millen, 1982)
 Peltodoris lippa Valdés, 2001
 Peltodoris mullineri Millen & Bertsch, 2000
 Peltodoris murrea (Abraham, 1877)
 Peltodoris nobilis MacFarland, 1905
 Peltodoris punctifera (Abraham, 1877)
 Peltodoris rosae Valdés & Bertsch, 2010
 Peltodoris temarensis Edmunds, 2011
Species brought into synonymy
 Peltodoris crucis (Mörch, 1863) sensu Bergh, 1880: synonym of Tayuva lilacina (Gould, 1852)
 Peltodoris fellowsi Kay & Young, 1969: synonym of Hiatodoris fellowsi (Kay & Young, 1969)
 Peltodoris greeleyi MacFarland, 1909: synonym of Montereina greeleyi (MacFarland, 1909)
 Peltodoris hummelincki Marcus & Marcus, 1963: synonym of Tayuva lilacina (Gould, 1852)
 Peltodoris marmorata Bergh, 1898: synonym of Anisodoris marmorata Bergh, 1898 accepted as Diaulula variolata (d'Orbigny, 1837)
 Peltodoris mauritiana Bergh, 1889  synonym of Peltodoris murrea (Abraham, 1877)
 Peltodoris nayarita Ortea & Llera, 1981: synonym of Montereina greeleyi (MacFarland, 1909)
 Peltodoris rubra Bergh, 1905: synonym of Discodoris rubra Bergh, 1905 
 Peltodoris variolata (d'Orbigny, 1837): synonym of Diaulula variolata (d'Orbigny, 1837)
Nomen dubium
 Peltodoris angulata Eliot, 1903 (nomen dubium)
 Peltodoris noumeae Risbec, 1937 (nomen dubium)

References

 Valdés Á. (2002). A phylogenetic analysis and systematic revision of the cryptobranch dorids (Mollusca, Nudibranchia, Anthobranchia). Zoological Journal of the Linnean Society 136: 535-636
 *  Dayrat B. 2010. A monographic revision of discodorid sea slugs (Gastropoda, Opisthobranchia, Nudibranchia, Doridina). Proceedings of the California Academy of Sciences, Series 4, vol. 61, suppl. I, 1-403, 382 figs.

Discodorididae
Gastropod genera